The Kingdom of Barue was a precolonial kingdom, centred around today's Báruè District in western Mozambique.

The kingdom first emerged as a provincial administration of the Kingdom of Mutapa. In 1512, António Fernandes recorded that the area of Barue had a king. This dynasty may have emerged in the 1480s. The waning of Mutapa power in the area coincided with the arrival of the Portuguese Empire, such that throughout its three-century existence, the Kingdom of Barue was a target of Portuguese attacks.

References 
Citations

Sources
 

Barue
History of Mozambique
Former countries in Africa